Islamia laiae is a species of small freshwater snail with a gill and an operculum, an aquatic gastropod mollusk in the family Hydrobiidae.

Distribution 
This species occurs in Majorca.

References

Hydrobiidae
Endemic fauna of the Balearic Islands
Fauna of Mallorca
Molluscs of Europe
Gastropods described in 2007